Unexplained EP  is an extended play (EP) by English band EMF. One of the tracks on the EP is a remake of Iggy & The Stooges' 1973 song "Search and Destroy". Released on 20 April 1992, the EP peaked at number 18 on the UK Singles Chart, number 16 on the Irish Singles Chart, and number 10 on the Portuguese Singles Chart.

Track listing
 "Getting Through" 
 "Far from Me" 
 "The Same" 
 "Search and Destroy"

Charts

References

1992 EPs
EMF (band) EPs
Parlophone EPs